Grob Ridge is a narrow ridge,  long, located 3 nautical miles south of Dyrdal Peak at the south end of the Forrestal Range, in the Pensacola Mountains of Antarctica. It was mapped by the United States Geological Survey from surveys and U.S. Navy air photos, 1956–66, and was named by the Advisory Committee on Antarctic Names for Richard W. Grob, a cook at Ellsworth Station, winter 1957.

References

Ridges of Queen Elizabeth Land